Kanly-Turkeyevo (Qañnı-Törkäy) is a rural locality (a selo) and the administrative centre of Kanly-Turkeyevsky Selsoviet, Buzdyaksky District, Bashkortostan, Russia. The population was 878 as of 2010. There are 6 streets.

Geography 
Kanly-Turkeyevo is located 29 km southwest of Buzdyak (the district's administrative centre) by road. Kuzminka is the nearest rural locality.

References 

Rural localities in Buzdyaksky District